Nowe Minięta  is a village in the administrative district of Gmina Mikołajki Pomorskie, within Sztum County, Pomeranian Voivodeship, in northern Poland.

For the history of the region, see History of Pomerania.

As of 2011 the village had a population of 116 redisidents.

References

Villages in Sztum County